Hot Dog with the Lot is a comedy game show created by Mark Ciobo that first aired in 2005 on community television (Channel 31) throughout Australia and New Zealand, but in 2007, the show was picked up for broadcast on Foxtel and Austar respectively in the two nations. The show was created and produced by a team of Melbourne filmmakers, some of whom created the successful Crazy Crosswords on Briz 31.

References

External links

2000s Australian game shows
Australian community access television shows
2005 Australian television series debuts
2005 New Zealand television series debuts